Paolo Benedetto Bellinzani (1682 – February 26, 1757) was an Italian composer of first half of the eighteenth century. Among his works are holy masses, offertories, duets, madrigals, litanies, motets and magnificat. His first known composition is a Requiem aeternam written in 1700 for two violins, Soprano, Alto, Tenor, Bass, Organ. He was active in the Italian regions of Friuli, Veneto, Emilia, Marche and Umbria.

Bellinzani died on February 26, 1757, in Recanati at the age of 74.

References

External links
 

1682 births
1757 deaths
Italian male composers
18th-century Italian composers
18th-century composers
18th-century Italian musicians
18th-century Italian male musicians